Hurricane Heather was one of the worst tropical cyclones to affect Arizona on record. The sixteenth tropical cyclone, eighth named storm, and fourth hurricane of the 1977 Pacific hurricane season, it began as a tropical disturbance on October 3, before later developing into a tropical depression on October 4. Later that day, the depression turned to the northwest, and was upgraded to Tropical Storm Heather. Continuing to strengthen, on October 5, Heather strengthened into a hurricane, and later that day its winds peaked at 85 mph (135 km/h). Heather began to turn north-northwest around this time, and by October 6, it weakened into a tropical storm. Moving north, Heather continued to weaken over cooler waters, and on October 7, the final advisory was issued, downgrading Heather to a tropical depression.

Heather's remnants later brought heavy rains to southeast Arizona and far northern parts of Sonora from October 6–10, causing severe flooding. The normally dry Santa Cruz River flooded several cities and towns along its path, reaching up to a 100-year flood stage near Nogales. Hundreds of people were driven from their homes due to flooding from Heather. Overall, the storm caused $15 million (1977 USD) in damage, primarily to agriculture, but caused no injuries or fatalities.

Meteorological history 

The depression turned to the northwest, and six hours later was upgraded to Tropical Storm Heather. Heather continued to intensify, and by 06:00 UTC on October 5, Heather was upgraded to a hurricane while 70 miles west of Socorro Island; the storm brought 60 mph (95 km/h) winds to the island at this time.

After this point, Heather began to weaken after moving north-northwest over colder SSTs. The final advisory on Heather was issued at 06:00 UTC on October 7, downgrading Heather to a tropical depression that was rapidly dissipating. Heather's remnants collided with a cold front on October 8 or 9, which became nearly stationary south of Nogales around this time for 24–36 hours, before weakening and moving east on October 10.

Impact 
Total damage from the storm was at least $15 million, with approximately $9 million of that coming in the Tucson, Arizona area; the city of Tucson itself lost $2.7 million, with about $1 million being lost at a sewage treatment plant. About $9 million of the damage was agriculture-related; $4.7 million of that came in the Tucson area, and an additional $3.2 million came in Santa Cruz County in Arizona. Another $4 million in damage was related to transportation; at least $1 million came from the Tucson area, where four roads crossing the dry riverbed of the Santa Cruz River outside city limits and another four roads crossing the Santa Cruz within city limits were damaged. The other $2 million was in damage to businesses, residential areas, and utilities. No injuries or fatalities were reported as a result of the storm. At least 90 homes flooded, mostly near Nogales, Arizona.

Arizona 
Heather's remnants produced heavy rainfall in southeast Arizona from October 6–10. A flash flood watch was put in place for the majority of Arizona on October 6, which included all of Arizona outside of Mohave County by early October 7. Flash flood warnings were in place for parts of Arizona later on October 7, and remained in place in southeast Arizona on October 8. The warnings were ultimately lifted on October 9 during the evening in eastern Pima, Cochise, and Santa Cruz counties. Residents of the city were urged to conserve and boil water, after wells of the city became unusable due to mud. Approximately 600 people, including 170 families, were evacuated in Nogales, with an estimate of 100 more people evacuated downstream.

The normally dry Santa Cruz River reached a 50-year flood stage near Tucson, and over a 100-year flood stage between Nogales and Continental; the river rose  in five minutes in Nogales, cresting shortly after this time. A 1-in-35 year flood event occurred along the Santa Cruz in Marana on October 10. Tucson had an inch of rain fall in one hour on October 6. As a result of the floods, a bridge leading to the Mount Hopkins Observatory collapsed, and several more bridges over the Santa Cruz River were damaged due to the flooding. In addition, flooding washed out a bridge on Interstate 19 between Tucson and Nogales, closing the interstate. A freight railway connecting the two cities had several bridges washed out and was flooded, leading to it being shut down until repairs were complete. The typically dry San Pedro and Gila rivers also flooded; the former's flood was considered severe. The town of Winkelman had one bridge wash out, and another just outside the town on Arizona State Route 177 was shut down; twenty people had to leave their homes due to flooding in the town. Riverside, Arizona was disconnected from the rest of the state when the bridge leading to the town was flooded; twenty families were evacuated from the town, and roughly 150 people moved uphill to escape floodwaters. Rio Rico had 700 families stranded after the access road leading to the town was flooded. The National Guard debated evacuating residents of Kino Springs, though this turned out to be unnecessary when the storm calmed down. Along the Santa Cruz, 15,600 acres of farmland were inundated in Santa Cruz and Pima counties.

Elsewhere 
Minor crop damage occurred around the city of Tulare, where roughly 1,000 electricity customers lost power; most of the customers had power back within 20 minutes. A flash flood watch was put in place along the coastal areas of San Diego and Riverside counties in California. The Yeso 2 S weather station outside of Yeso, New Mexico recorded  of rain, the highest total in the state. In a period of six hours on October 6, the Cannon Air Force Base outside Clovis, New Mexico received  of rain, while Albuquerque received  of rain in a 24-hour period. Parts of south and southwest Colorado and west and central New Mexico had flash flood watches issued by October 7; later that day, some were upgraded to warnings.

An unknown number of people in Nogales, Sonora were told to move to higher ground. In Hermosillo and surrounding areas, roughly 100 families were left homeless after flash floods from the storm. The village of Cibuta had 45 families evacuated, while 40 more were evacuated from Agua Zarca. Another 20 families were rescued by a helicopter sent by Arizona Governor Raúl Héctor Castro after being trapped by the Cibuta River. Over 98,000 acres of cotton crops were damaged by rains from Heather in Mexico.

Aftermath 
The governor of Arizona at the time, Raúl Héctor Castro, declared Santa Cruz County a disaster area. By October 12, Castro had declared a proclamation of emergency for the counties of Santa Cruz, Pima and Pinal. The Santa Cruz County Red Cross set up a relief program after the storm, which provided free food, clothing, shelter and medical care to victims of the storm. On October 20, Wesley Bolin was sworn in as the new governor of Arizona and requested president Jimmy Carter to declare Santa Cruz, Pima, and Pinal counties major disaster areas after the storm; six days later, he requested $11.3 million in flood relief from Carter. Pima County itself requested $1.8 million in flood relief; it got approximately $1.3 million in August 1978. The Arizona State Emergency Council authorized $250,000 to be used for repairs of "essential public facilities", along with $50,000 that had been approved for emergency repairs on October 9 by Castro.

Multiple bridges in Pima County were expected to take up to two months to be repaired to a point where they could be used. The Camino del Cerro bridge was originally expected to take between three months and $75,000–150,000 for building a similar bridge, or up to seven months and $800,000 if they built a completely different bridge. The bridge ultimately ended up costing $870,000 to complete; $600,000 of the funds were supplied by the federal government. The new bridge opened in November 1979.

See also 

 Tropical Storm Norma (1970) – Killed 23 people in Arizona
 Hurricane Kathleen (1976) – Brought record rainfall to California a year prior
 Hurricane Doreen (1977) – Caused heavy flooding in California earlier in 1977
 Tropical Storm Octave (1983) – Considered the worst tropical cyclone on record in Arizona
 Hurricane Nora (1997) – Reached Arizona as a tropical storm and caused record precipitation
 Hurricane Norbert (2014) – Remnants of the storm caused catastrophic flooding in Arizona
 List of Arizona hurricanes
 List of wettest tropical cyclones in Arizona

References 

1977 in Arizona
1977 Pacific hurricane season
Hurricanes in Arizona
Category 1 Pacific hurricanes
1977 natural disasters in the United States
October 1977 events in the United States
Pacific hurricanes in Mexico
October 1977 events in Mexico